Go Heung (?-?) was an ancient Baekje (which was one of the Three Kingdoms of Korea) scholar who served under King Geunchogo of Baekje. He is Han Chinese.

His whole life is mostly unknown. His only mention was in Samguk Sagi as a scholar who wrote about the history of Baekje onto a manuscript called Seogi (서기, 書記), but it no longer exists.

References 

Baekje people
4th-century Korean people
Korean people of Chinese descent